Francis Foljambe may refer to:

 Francis Foljambe (Liberal politician) (1830–1917), Member of Parliament for East Retford
 Sir Francis Foljambe, 1st Baronet (died 1640), Member of Parliament for Pontefract
 Francis Ferrand Foljambe (1749–1814), Member of Parliament for Yorkshire, and for Higham Ferrers